Birgitta Jönsson (born 1 December 1961) is a former Swedish Olympic swimmer. She was a part of the silver medal winning 4×200 m freestyle team in the 1980 Summer Olympics, swimming a leg in the prelims.

Clubs
Avesta SS

References

1961 births
Living people
Swimmers at the 1980 Summer Olympics
Olympic swimmers of Sweden
Swedish female freestyle swimmers
20th-century Swedish women